Ağalı, Zangilan may refer to:
Birinci Ağalı, first Ağalı
İkinci Ağalı, second Ağalı
Üçüncü Ağalı, third Ağalı